Trilla is an unincorporated community in Pleasant Grove Township, Coles County, Illinois, United States.

Geography

Trilla's ZIP code is 62469.

Demographics

References 

Unincorporated communities in Coles County, Illinois
Unincorporated communities in Illinois